Sir Thomas Frankland Lewis, 1st Baronet (14 May 1780 – 22 January 1855) was a British Poor Law Commissioner and moderate Tory MP.

Early life
Lewis was the son of John Lewis and Anne Frankland, daughter of Sir Thomas Frankland, 5th Baronet. Born in Great Ormond Street, London, he was educated at Eton College, and attended Christ Church, Oxford without taking a degree. His father died in 1797.

Parliamentarian
Lewis was an improving landlord of the family estates in Radnorshire, and was appointed High Sheriff of Radnorshire for 1804–05. He was ambitious to enter national politics as a Member of Parliament, which he did in 1812 as a follower of Lord Bulkeley, at Beaumaris.

Lewis was an MP for most years between 1812 and 1855, for Ennis (1826–1828), for Radnorshire (1828–1834) and for Radnor Boroughs (1847–1855). Initially he was known as a Grenvillite; while he supported the landowner and agricultural interest, his sympathy with Catholic emancipation made him unacceptable to the Tory ministry. From 1821 onwards he took the advice of Lord Grenville to establish himself by means of public commission work.

He was elected a Fellow of the Royal Society in 1820.

Commissioner
On 24 June 1824, Lewis was appointed to the Royal Commission for inquiring into the nature and extent of the Instruction afforded by the several Institutions in Ireland established for the purpose of Education where he served with the other Commissioners: John Leslie Foster, William Grant, James Glassford and Anthony Richard Blake.

As chairman (1834 - 1839) of the Poor Law Commission, he immediately clashed with Edwin Chadwick, who had been the driving force for Poor Law reform. Chadwick was Secretary, not (as he had hoped) on the Board itself; and Lewis with George Nicholls and John Shaw-Lefevre proceeded to overrule his views.

Lewis chaired the commission on the Rebecca Riots, and the subsequent commission that abolished the turnpike trusts. He was created a baronet in 1846.

Family
He married Harriet Cornewall, a daughter of Sir George Cornewall, 2nd Baronet and Catherine Cornewall. They had two children:

George Cornewall Lewis (21 April 1806 – 13 April 1863).
Gilbert Frankland Lewis (21 July 1808 – 18 December 1883).

References

External links
Victorianweb article on the Poor Law Commissioner
 

1780 births
1855 deaths
People educated at Eton College
Alumni of Christ Church, Oxford
People from Powys
Lewis, Sir Thomas, 1st Baronet
Members of the Privy Council of the United Kingdom
Members of the Parliament of the United Kingdom for County Clare constituencies (1801–1922)
UK MPs 1812–1818
UK MPs 1818–1820
UK MPs 1820–1826
UK MPs 1826–1830
UK MPs 1830–1831
UK MPs 1831–1832
UK MPs 1832–1835
UK MPs 1847–1852
UK MPs 1852–1857
Conservative Party (UK) MPs for Welsh constituencies
Fellows of the Royal Society
High Sheriffs of Radnorshire
Tory MPs (pre-1834)
Members of the Parliament of the United Kingdom for Beaumaris